The North Otago Rugby Football Union were the third-place team in the 2008 Heartland Championship after winning the Meads Cup in 2007.

North Otago's 2008 season livery is supplied by Samurai Sportswear

2008 Pool Games
North Otago are to play Auckland for the Ranfurly Shield on 22 July, in Oamaru

RS=Ranfurly Shield, HS=Hanan Shield

Horowhenua-Kapiti
North Otago started off their 2008 Heartland Championship season with a 32-11 win over Horowhenua-Kapiti in Oamaru. It was Ross Hay's 100th match for the Turbines and it became Nathan Cunningham's 50th game when he replaced Mike Mavor in the second half. North Otago started the game slowly but managed to go to the break ahead 15-6. The second half was a different story for North Otago, as they pulled away from Horowhenua-Kapiti and picked up a bonus point in their 32-11 Round One win. 

(North Otago 32-Hamish McKenzie 2, Mike Mavor, Matt Clutterbuck tries Horowhenua Kapiti 11-Aloe try, 2 pen)

West Coast
North Otago travelled to Rugby Park, Greymouth for their round two clash with West Coast. After a solid first half from both teams, North Otago managed to hold a halftime lead of 10-6. Very little separated the teams in the second half but after a late serge from West Coast it looked as if the game could have gone to either side, but it was North Otago that held on for the 15-9 win.

(North Otago 15-Tuataina Samisoni, Samisoni TongoTongo tries, Pale Tuilagi penalty, conversionWest Coast 9-Corey Simpson 2 penalties, drop goal)

South Canterbury
North Otago suffered their first loss of their 2008 Heartland Championship when they went down 18-10 to South Canterbury, in Oamaru. North Otago failed to take their chances as South Canterbury defended all day and held North Otago out to take the win. (North Otago 10-Jeremy Te Huia try, Pale Tuilagi con, pen South Canterbury 18-Malakai Fonua 2 tries, Luke Reihana con, Scott Norton 2 pen)

Buller
North Otago continued their push for the Meads Cup after beating Buller 22-18 in Westport. The win put North Otago into second position in pool A, behind West Coast. (North Otago 22-Mike Mavor, Ekeroma Sifo, Josh Collier tries, Pale Tuilagi 2 con, pen
Buller 18-Mitieli Kaloudigibecki, Simon Lloyd tries, Nathan Thompson con, 2 pen)

Wararapa-Bush
North Otago put together their best performance so far this season with a comfortable win over Wararapa-Bush in Oamaru. North Otago led 10-7 at half-time, but it was an exciting second half that saw North Otago's lead extended. 8 minutes into the second half Ross Hay charged down Cash Lafaele's clearing kick, gathering the ball up on the bounce to cross the line. North Otago held the led throughout the second half despite a late charge from Wairarapa-Bush. Lemi Masoe was at his best, scoring two tries, while Pale Tuilagi proved his worth by not missing a kick all game. (North Otago 44-Lemi Masoe 2, Ross Hay, Samisoni Tongo Tongo, Jone Paumau tries Pale Tuilagi 5 con, 3 pen Wairarapa Bush 19-Charles Walker-Blair, Junior Togia, Paeto Lafaele tries Paddy Rimene 2 con)

Meads Cup

HS=Hanan Shield

2008 Squad

Forwards
Toetuu Hausia
Lotu Tonga
John Blakely
Tobias Sekona
Fraser Fletcher
Aisake Fonua
Taua Limuloa(Tahaafe)
Marc Comb
Sione Aho
Samisoni Tongotongo
Ross Hay
Viliami Leo
Joe Mamea(c)

Backs
Hamish McKenzie
Nick Webster
Jeremy Te Huia
Nathan Cunningham
Ekeroma Sefo
Siaosi Folau
Chris Talanoa
Tim Milmine
Mike Penn.

Heartland Championship
North Otago